Luis Sarmiento (born 7 October 1971) is a Cuban wrestler. He competed in the men's Greco-Roman 57 kg at the 1996 Summer Olympics.

References

1971 births
Living people
Cuban male sport wrestlers
Olympic wrestlers of Cuba
Wrestlers at the 1996 Summer Olympics
Sportspeople from Camagüey